Arvīds Lejnieks (born 1913, date of death unknown) was a Latvian speed skater. He competed in two events at the 1936 Winter Olympics.

References

1913 births
Year of death missing
Latvian male speed skaters
Olympic speed skaters of Latvia
Speed skaters at the 1936 Winter Olympics
Place of birth missing